Clavilithes is an extinct genus of fossil sea snails, marine gastropod mollusks in the family Fasciolariidae, the tulip snails and spindle snails.

This genus lived from the Paleocene to Pliocene, in Africa, Asia, Europe, North America, and South America.

References

Further reading 
 Fossils (Smithsonian Handbooks) by David Ward (Page 129)

Fasciolariidae
Gastropod genera
Paleocene gastropods
Eocene gastropods
Oligocene gastropods
Miocene gastropods
Pliocene gastropods
Cenozoic animals of Africa
Cenozoic animals of Asia
Cenozoic animals of Europe
Prehistoric gastropods of North America
Cenozoic animals of South America
Paleocene first appearances
Pliocene extinctions